Mud (original title Kal) is a 1997 Bulgarian short drama film written, directed and produced by Ivaylo Simidchiev. It was shot on 35 mm black and white film with a runtime of 22 minutes.

Plot
The film is about a foreigner in Bulgaria, who gets accidentally involved in chasing a stray child. During the action, the child injures him, but then tries to save him.

Cast
 Blagoje Nikolic – Foreigner
 Petar Vasilev – Gipsy kid
 Phillip Avramov – Gipsy gang chief
 Dafina Katzarraska
 Krasimir Kolev
 Traian Borisov
 Krasimir Jelev
 Stefan Shopov
 Asen Vasilev

Awards
 Official Selection at the Cinéfondation of the 1998 Cannes Film Festival
 "A Certain Regard" Award for Cinematography, Popovo, Bulgaria, 1998 
 "Most Surprising Film" Award, Odense Film festival, Denmark, 1998 
 "Kodak's Best Film" Award, Sofia Intntnl. Student Film Festival, Bulgaria, 1998 
 "Special Mention of the Jury", Festival Premiers Plans, Angers, France, 1998 
 "Best Director" Award, International Munich Festival, Germany, 1997 
 "VFF Young Talent Award", International Munich Festival, Germany, 1997 
 "Best Balkan Short Film" Award, Short Film Festival of Drama, Greece, 1997 
 "All-Russian State Cinematography Institute (VGIK) Honorable Diploma", 1997

References

External links

1997 films